August Georg Wilhelm Pezold (9 August 1794, Rakvere – 12 March 1859, Saint Petersburg) was a Baltic-German painter and lithographer.

Biography 
His father was a doctor. Both of his parents died while he was still a child and he was raised by the Rehbinder family (former patients of his father) at their estate in Udriku. He then attended the "Domschule" (Cathedral School) in Tallinn.

From 1812 to 1814, he followed in his father's footsteps; studying medicine at the University of Dorpat (Tartu). After that, he decided to devote himself to art and accompanied his friend, Otto Friedrich Ignatius, to Berlin, where they enrolled at the Academy of Arts.

From 1815 to 1816, he studied at the Academy of Fine Arts Vienna. After a year there he, Ignatius and Gustav Adolf Hippius spent two years travelling in Italy, then a year in Switzerland. After detours to Paris and London, he returned to Estonia in 1821.

He worked primarily as a portrait painter, both there and in Livonia; primarily Riga. From 1824 to 1830, he was a drawing teacher at the Smolny Institute in Saint Petersburg. He later travelled throughout central Europe and Finland but had to return home in 1837, due to the accidental deaths of two of his sons and his wife's subsequent illness. He was named a "free-artist" by the University of Saint Petersburg in 1839.

In 1842, he became one of the founders of the "Estonian Literary Society" and began teaching at the University in Saint Petersburg. In 1854, he was appointed a member of the Imperial Academy of Arts.

In addition to his portraits and some landscapes, he painted scenes of rural life and the peasantry in what later would be called the Naïve style. He has also been referred to as a practitioner of Estonian Biedermeier.

References

External links 

 Works at the Eesti Kunstimuuseum
 Biography @ the Kulturportal West-Ost

1794 births
1859 deaths
People from Rakvere
People from the Governorate of Estonia
Baltic-German people
Estonian painters
Portrait painters
19th-century lithographers
German lithographers
Estonian lithographers
19th-century German artists